Micrelephas chalybeus is a moth in the family Crambidae. It was described by Bernard Landry in 2003. It is found in Costa Rica.

References

Crambini
Moths described in 2000
Moths of Central America